Deadvlei is a white clay pan located near the more famous salt pan of Sossusvlei, inside the Namib-Naukluft Park in Namibia. Also written DeadVlei or Dead Vlei, its name means "dead marsh" (from English dead, and Afrikaans vlei, a lake or marsh in a valley between the dunes). The pan also is referred to as "Dooie Vlei" which is the Afrikaans name. There are many references to the site on the Internet, its name often being translated erroneously in terms such as "dead valley"; a vlei is not a valley (which in Afrikaans is "vallei"). Nor is the site a valley; the pan is a desiccated vlei.

Dead Vlei has been claimed to be surrounded by the highest sand dunes in the world, the highest reaching 300–400 meters (350m on average, named "Big Daddy" or "Crazy Dune"), which rest on a sandstone terrace.

The clay pan was formed after rainfall, when the Tsauchab river flooded, creating temporary shallow pools where the abundance of water allowed camel thorn trees to grow. When the climate changed, drought hit the area, and sand dunes encroached on the pan, which blocked the river from the area.

The trees died, as there no longer was enough water to survive. There are some species of plants remaining, such as salsola and clumps of nara, adapted to surviving off the morning mist and very rare rainfall. The remaining skeletons of the trees, which are believed to have died 600–700 years ago (ca. 1340-1430), are now black because the intense sun has scorched them. Though not petrified, the wood does not decompose because it is so dry.

Films partly shot there include The Cell, The Fall, and Ghajini.

Gallery

References

Resources
More information and photos of Deadvlei

Further reading

P & M Bridgeford, Touring Sossusvlei and Sesriem. 

Geography of Namibia